The Joint Forces Maneuver Regiment is a military logistics regiment of the Italian Armed Forces based in Rome. The regiment is operationally assigned to the Defense General Staff and provides the necessary transport for the staff and the Italian Ministry of Defense to operate. Originally the unit, named 10th Interforces Maneuver Auto Group "Salaria", was part of the Italian Army, but on 1 January 2004 the unit was renamed 10th Transport Battalion "Salaria" and entered the newly raised Joint Forces Maneuver Regiment, which became a joint unit of the Italian Armed Forces, even though the regiment's personnel continues to be drawn from the army's Transport and Material Arm. Like all Italian Army transport units the regiment's battalion was named for a historic road near its base: in the 10th battalion's case for the Roman road Via Salaria.

Current structure 
As of 2022 the Joint Forces Maneuver Regiment consists of:

  Regimental Command, in Rome
 Command and Logistic Support Company
 10th Transport Battalion "Salaria"
 1st Transport Company
 2nd Transport Company
 3rd Transport Company
 4th Transport Company
 Maintenance Company

The Command and Logistic Support Company fields the following platoons: C3 Platoon, Transport and Materiel Platoon, Medical Platoon, and Commissariat Platoon.

See also 
 Military logistics

External links
Italian Ministry of Defense: Reggimento di Manovra Interforze

References 

Logistic Regiments of Italy